Eduardos Kontogeorgakis (born 20 December 1949) is a former professional footballer who played as a midfielder. Born in Argentina, he represented Greece at international level.

Career
Kontogeorgakis played club football in Argentina and Greece for Atlanta, PAS Giannina and Kerkyra. He was one of a number of Argentine players to play for PAS Giannina in the early 1970s.

He earned three caps for Greece in 1978.

Personal life
His father is Eduardo Ricagni. Kontogeorgakis was born as Eduardo Ricagni like his father. When he moved in Greece in 1973, he used his maternal grandfather's surname. His grandfather was a refugee from Asia Minor who settled in Chios and then immigrated to Argentina, while his maternal grandmother was Spanish.

References

1949 births
Living people
Argentine people of Greek descent
Argentine footballers
Greek footballers
Greece international footballers
Club Atlético Atlanta footballers
PAS Giannina F.C. players
A.O. Kerkyra players
Super League Greece players
Association football midfielders